Osokorivka is a village in Beryslav Raion, Kherson Oblast, southern Ukraine. It belongs to the Novovorontsovka settlement hromada, one of the hromadas of Ukraine. The village had a population of 2,747.

Administrative status 
Until 18 July, 2020, Osokorivka belonged to Novovorontsovka Raion. The raion was abolished in July 2020 as part of the administrative reform of Ukraine, which reduced the number of raions of Kherson Oblast to five. The area of Novovorontsovka Raion was merged into Beryslav Raion.

References

External links
 Osokorivka at the Verkhovna Rada of Ukraine site

Villages in Beryslav Raion
Khersonsky Uyezd
Populated places on the Dnieper in Ukraine